Paul Liu Hanzuo was a Chinese catholic priest of the Paris Foreign Missions Society. He was martyred in 1818 by the Chinese government for being a Christian. He is a venerated as martyr and a saint in the Catholic Church.

Early life and priesthood 
Liu was born in year 1778 in Lezhi County, Sichuan, China. He belonged to a fervent Catholic family. Because of scarcity of the financial support he couldn't get proper initial schooling but joined the seminary at the age of 24. He was allowed to study  philosophy and theology in Chinese because he didn't know Latin. He was ordained a priest for the congregation of Paris Foreign Missions Society in his 30's. He was assigned missionary work in Apostolic Vicariate of Sichuan, now known as the Roman Catholic Diocese of Chengdu.

Martyrdom 
As Christians were persecuted at that time in China so he used to work as a vegetable vendor in the daytime and used to offer mass for the Christians at night. A local carpenter informed the authorities about Liu and his faith, so the authorities arrested him while he was offering mass on 15 August 1817. Authorities asked him to renounce his faith or pay a heavy bribe to get released from the jail but he didn't have that much money to pay and refused to renounce his faith. He was ordered to be executed. As per the order of the court he was strangled to death on 13 February 1818 at the Square of Execution at the East Gate of  Chengdu, Sichuan, China.

Canonization 
Liu was venerated as a martyr on 2 July 1899 by Pope Leo XIII and beatified on 27 May 1900 by Pope Leo XIII. He was canonized on 1 October 2000 by Pope John Paul II.

References 

Chinese Roman Catholic saints
19th-century Chinese Roman Catholic priests
19th-century Roman Catholic martyrs
1818 deaths
1778 births